Eirik Faret Sakariassen (born 28 January 1991) is a Norwegian politician for the Socialist Left Party.

He was first elected to Stavanger city council in 2011. He served as a deputy representative to the Parliament of Norway from Rogaland during the term 2017–2021.

References

1991 births
Living people
Politicians from Stavanger
Deputy members of the Storting
Socialist Left Party (Norway) politicians